Zeenat Anjum Khattak (1939 – 2017), commonly known as Fozia Anjum, was a Pashto-language poet, educationist and radio broadcaster.

Book
She wrote Da Ranra Pa Lor.

References

Pashto-language poets
1939 births
2017 deaths
Pakistani radio presenters
Pashtun women
University of Peshawar alumni
Academic staff of the University of Peshawar